Cartersville Historic District is a national historic district located at Cartersville, Cumberland County, Virginia.  It encompasses 51 contributing buildings and 2 contributing sites in the village of Cartersville.  Most of the buildings date to the turn of the 20th century, with a number of late-18th- and 19th-century dwellings and former taverns, two churches, a few commercial buildings, a post office, and a former school.  Notable buildings include the Deanery (1780s), Glaser House (1790s), Baptist Parsonage (1790s), Cartersville Tavern (c. 1810), Cartersville Baptist Church (c. 1906), St. Catherine's Catholic Church (1910), Cartersville Methodist Episcopal Church (1883), Cartersville Post Office (1910), Cartersville Bank (c. 1900), Culbertson House (c. 1910), H. T. Harrison House (c. 1800, c. 1900), and W. E. Robinson House (c. 1909), Newstead Manor (c. 1920).

It was added to the National Register of Historic Places in 1993.

References

Historic districts on the National Register of Historic Places in Virginia
National Register of Historic Places in Cumberland County, Virginia
Queen Anne architecture in Virginia
Federal architecture in Virginia
Colonial Revival architecture in Virginia
Geography of Cumberland County, Virginia